Kordi Dam, is an earthfill dam on Kordi river near Navapur, Nandurbar district in state of Maharashtra in India.

Specifications

Purpose
 Irrigation

See also
 Dams in Maharashtra
 List of reservoirs and dams in India

References

Dams in Nandurbar district
Dams completed in 1985
1985 establishments in Maharashtra